Thomas "Tom" Williams (birth unknown – death unknown) was a Welsh professional rugby league footballer who played in the 1910s.

International honours
Williams won a cap for Wales while at Oldham in 1913.

References

External links
Statistics at orl-heritagetrust.org.uk

Oldham R.L.F.C. players
Wales national rugby league team players
Welsh rugby league players
Rugby league wingers
Year of birth missing
Year of death missing
Place of birth missing
Place of death missing